Special Investigations Section or Special Investigation Section may refer to:

 LAPD Special Investigation Section, a tactical detective and stakeout unit of the Los Angeles Police Department
 Special Investigation Section, a Special Investigation Team of the Kanagawa Prefectural Police
 Special Investigation Section, a unit in the Criminal Investigation Department of the Singapore Police Force
 Assorted criminal investigation units of the following police forces:
 Atlantic City Police Department
 Baltimore Police Department
 Halifax Regional Police
 Indianapolis Metropolitan Police Department
 Las Vegas Metropolitan Police Department
 Miami Police Department
 Miami Gardens Police Department
 Rochester Police Department
 Sarasota County Sheriff's Office
 Tucson Police Department
 Vancouver Police Department
 Metro Vancouver Transit Police
 State bureau of investigation units of the following American state police forces and state agencies:
 Arizona Attorney General
 Delaware State Police
 Indiana State Police
 Kentucky State Police
 Michigan State Police
 New Jersey State Police
 Tennessee Department of Revenue
 Washington State Patrol

See also 

 SIS (disambiguation)
 Special Investigations Unit (disambiguation)
 Special Investigations Bureau (disambiguation)
 Special Investigations Division (disambiguation)
 Office of Special Investigations (disambiguation)
 Special Investigations (disambiguation)

Disambiguation pages